Harmonizer is the thirteenth studio album by the American garage rock musician Ty Segall, released on August 3, 2021, on Drag City Records. Co-produced by Segall and Cooper Crain, the album's initial digital release was a surprise, with physical copies following in October 2021.

The album features contributions from Denée Segall, who co-wrote and sings lead vocals on "Feel Good", and the members of Segall's backing band, the Freedom Band: Mikal Cronin (bass), Charles Moothart (drums), Emmett Kelly (guitar) and Ben Boye (keyboards).

Background and recording
The album was recorded at Segall's new home studio, Harmonizer Studios, in Topanga, California during the COVID-19 pandemic. A press release described the album as "a synthtastic production redesign that finds Ty dialing up a wealth of tightly controlled beats, thick keyboard textures, guitar and endless harmonies. This glossy sound makes for some of Ty's cleanest songs and starkest ideas to date, bracing him as he revisits the lonely days and loathsome nights of the alienated, grown-up-wrong soul."

Track listing

Personnel
Musicians
 Ty Segall – vocals, bass, drums, guitar, percussion, synthesizer
 Mikal Cronin - bass guitar (2, 5 and 8)
 Emmett Kelly - guitar (2, 5 and 8), backing vocals (2)
 Charles Moothart - drums and percussion (4, 5 and 9)
 Ben Boye - Rhodes piano (2), piano (8)
 Denée Segall - lead vocals (9)
 Cooper Crain - synthesizer (9) and "general modulation overall"

Recording personnel
 Ty Segall - production, mixing
 Cooper Crain – production, engineering, mixing
 Ben Boye - piano recording (8)

Artwork
 Denée Segall - artwork, photography

Charts

References

2021 albums
Drag City (record label) albums
Ty Segall albums